Flore Vandenhoucke (born 15 March 1995) is a Belgian badminton player. She competed at the 2015 and 2019 European Games.

Achievements

BWF International Challenge/Series 
Women's doubles

Mixed doubles

  BWF International Challenge tournament
  BWF International Series tournament
  BWF Future Series tournament

References

External links 
 
 

1995 births
Living people
People from Ronse
Belgian female badminton players
Badminton players at the 2015 European Games
Badminton players at the 2019 European Games
European Games competitors for Belgium
Sportspeople from East Flanders